Falun Municipality (Falu kommun) is a municipality in Dalarna County in central Sweden. Its seat is located in the city of Falun. Falun is the second biggest city and provincial capital of Dalarna County. Falun was originally famous for its copper mine.

The present municipality was formed at the time of the local government reform of 1971, when the City of Falun and six surrounding rural municipalities were amalgamated.

Localities 
Aspeboda
Bengtsheden
Bjursås
Danholn
Grycksbo
Falun (seat)
Linghed
Sundborn
Svärdsjö
Sågmyra
Toftbyn
Vika

Riksdag elections

Local politics 
The Falu Party is a party with local interests.

Sister cities
The following places have sister cities agreements with Falun:
 Hamina, Finland 
 Grudziądz, Poland
 Gütersloh, Germany
 Vordingborg, Denmark

Falun also has two cooperation towns without formal sistering treaty:
 Kimberley, South Africa
 Pskov, Russia

References

External links

 
Dalarna College - Situated in Falun

Municipalities of Dalarna County